The women's team sabre fencing event at the 2017 Summer Universiade was held 25 August at the Taipei Nangang Exhibition Center in Taipei, Taiwan.

Seeds 
Since the number of individual épée event participants are 61, 62 will be the added number on those who did not participate in the individual event.

Ranking Round

Final ranking

References 

Fencing at the 2017 Summer Universiade